Antonis Tsiftsis (born 21 July 1999) is a Greek professional footballer who plays as a goalkeeper for Super League club Asteras Tripolis.

Career
Tsiftsis made his debut in a 4–0 home triumph against Platanias, on 2 April 2018.

On 13 May 2019, he signed a new contract, running until the summer of 2022.

In the 2020–21 season, Tsiftsis made 17 appearances across all competitions and on 26 April 2021 put he pen to paper to a new four-year contract, which will keep tied to the club until 2025.

Career statistics

Club

References

1999 births
Living people
Greek footballers
Greece youth international footballers
Super League Greece players
Asteras Tripolis F.C. players
Association football goalkeepers
Footballers from Giannitsa